The 2022 Missouri Valley Conference women's basketball tournament, promoted as Hoops in the Heartland, was part of the 2021–22 NCAA Division I women's basketball season and was played in Moline, Illinois, March 10–13, 2021, at the TaxSlayer Center.

Seeds

Schedule

Tournament bracket

* denotes overtime

See also
 2022 Missouri Valley Conference men's basketball tournament

References

External links
Hoops in the Heartland
Missouri Valley Conference Official Website

2021–22 Missouri Valley Conference women's basketball season
Missouri Valley Conference women's basketball tournament
Basketball in Illinois